Film and television shows shot in Wilmington are usually independent and or low-budget films. This is mainly due to Wilmington, North Carolina being relatively more affordable than other cities to film. Some other reasons for Wilmington's appeal is the local university (UNCW) and the cities beach's along with historic buildings and vast swamps outside of Wilmington. It has remained the largest film production area in North Carolina since the 1980s.

Producer Dino De Laurentiis first came to Wilmington to film Firestarter in 1984. He would later create the De Laurentiis Entertainment Group and founded its headquarters in Wilmington. After the company declared bankruptcy and eventual closing in 1989, its studio in Wilmington was sold to EUE/Screen Gems.

In 2013, Marvel's "Iron Man 3" was released to theaters; some places used in the film were the Port of Wilmington, Cape Fear River, and New Hanover Regional Medical Center. This film has remained the largest film to be produced in Wilmington. In the mid-2010s the city's desirability faded due to the North Carolina General Assembly not extending film incentives and Governor Pat McCrory signing the controversial HB2 bill. Most of the business went to Atlanta, Georgia where EUE/Screen Gems also has a studio. Partially due to the COVID-19 Pandemic and Georgia passing controversial election restrictions, filming in the city began to increase again with 2022 being its biggest year to date. In that same year, Dark Horse Studios planned a 20 million dollar expansion to their studio in Wilmington.

As of 2020, 138 Films and 162 Television shows have been shot in the city. Some nicknames for the city are "Wilmywood" and "Hollywood of the East" or "Hollywood East."

Feature-length films 
Feature-length films from 1984 to 2023.

Television shows and TV movies 
Television series and TV Movies from 1988 to 2023 (excludes shows that filmed a single episode in Wilmington or news stories; only notable TV movies are listed below).

See also 

 North Carolina Film Office
 Cucalorus Film Festival
 List of biggest box-office bombs
 B movies since the 1980s

References

External links 
 Current Productions in Wilmington, NC
 EUE/Screen Gems of Wilmington, NC
 Wilmington Regional Film Commission

Wilmington, North Carolina
Cinema of North Carolina